Shklovsky or Shklovskii may refer to:

 Boris Shklovskii (born 1944), a theoretical physicist
 Iosif Shklovsky (1916 – 1985), a Russian astrophysicist
 Viktor Shklovsky (1893 – 1984), a Russian writer